The   (often called  or simply  ('the general [logothete]'), and usually rendered in English as the General Logothete, was in charge of the 'general financial ministry', the  of the middle Byzantine Empire.

History and functions

The  was responsible for general taxation and revenue, and also served as a court for financial cases. As such, it broadly fulfilled the tasks of the earlier , although it was mostly derived from the "general department" of the praetorian prefecture. The first attested , the monk Theodotos, is mentioned in 692, but the post may have been instituted as early as 626. During the Komnenian period, its importance declined, but recovered under the Angeloi.

His distinctive court dress and insignia during this time were a brimmed hat called  of white silk, a silk long kaftan-like , and for ceremonies and festivities, a domed  hat of white and gold silk, with gold-wire embroidery and decorated with images of the emperor in the front and back. Unlike other officials, he bore no staff of office. Amongst the Palaiologan-era holders were significant intellectuals and statesmen, such as George Akropolites and Theodore Metochites. The last recorded  was a certain John Androuses in 1380. By that time, however, its original functions had long been forgotten; as the Pseudo-Kodinos records, "the function of the General Logothete is unknown".

Subordinate officials
The subordinates of the logothetēs tou genikou were:

The  ('great chartularies of the department'), the heads of the various departments.
The  (where  means '[money] box"' i.e. As their name signifies, they were the senior treasury officials posted in the provinces ('outer', i.e. outside Constantinople).
The  ('counts of the waters'), officials probably in charge of aqueducts and water supply in the provinces.
The  or simply , whose precise functions are unknown. By the 11th century, the office had become an independent bureau, but vanishes after that.
The , who were customs officials. Attested since the early 6th century, they are likely the successors of the  mentioned in the Notitia Dignitatum. Initially stationed at the frontier, after the 7th century they were placed at ports or in charge over entire  or individual islands.
The  [of the ] ('in charge of the curatorship [of the imperial domains]'), who supervised the imperial estates.
The , an official probably in charge of the mines and gold bullion (cf. , 'gold, precious metals'). It is therefore usually assumed that he is the successor of the old .
The  (κομ[β]εντιανός), an official of unknown function.
Originally senior officials in the praetorian prefecture, in the middle Byzantine period they were mid-level secretaries in the various ministries.

References

Sources

 
 
 
 
 

Byzantine fiscal offices
Byzantine court titles